Banon is a French cheese made in the region around the town of Banon in Provence, south-east France.

This pungent uncooked, unpressed cheese consists of a fine soft white pâte that is wrapped in chestnut leaves and tied with raffia prior to shipment.

The Provençal specialty fromage fort du Mont Ventoux is created by placing a young banon in an earthenware jar. The cheese is then seasoned with salt and pepper, doused in vinegar and eau-de-vie and left in a cool cellar to ferment. The concoction will develop an increasingly fierce taste capable of lasting for many years .

History 
Small goat's cheeses have been made in the dry hills of Provence since Roman times. As it is sold today, the cheese was first made by a couple in the village of Puimichel near to the town of Banon in the département of Alpes-de-Haute-Provence.

Manufacture 
The affinage period lasts for two weeks, following which it is dipped in eau de vie and wrapped in chestnut leaves that have been softened and sterilized by boiling in a mixture of water and vinegar. The cheese is at its best when made between spring and autumn.

Banon was awarded the Appellation d'Origine Contrôlée (AOC) label in 2003.

See also
 List of goat milk cheeses

References

External links 

 
 Banon in Tout Un Fromage

Cheeses with designation of origin protected in the European Union
Cuisine of Provence
Occitan cheeses
Goat's-milk cheeses